Aliabad-e Jadid (also Romanized as ‘Alīābād-e Jadīd; also known as ‘Alīābād) is a village in Bala Khaf Rural District, Salami District, Khaf County, Razavi Khorasan Province, Iran. At the 2006 census, its population was 570, in 118 families.

See also 

 List of cities, towns and villages in Razavi Khorasan Province

References 

Populated places in Khaf County